Ujedia is a village located in Sabarkantha district, Gujarat, India.

References

Villages in Sabarkantha district